Yenisahra is an underground station on the M4 line of the Istanbul Metro. Located under beneath the D.100 state highway, just west of the Kozyatağı Interchange in the Sahrayı Cedit neighborhood of Kadıköy, Istanbul, it was opened on 17 August 2012. Connections to Havabüs express bus service to Sabiha Gökçen Airport are available.

Station Layout

References

External links
Göztepe station portal in Google Street View

Railway stations opened in 2012
Istanbul metro stations
Transport in Kadıköy
2012 establishments in Turkey